Avalon-Chanel Weyzig (born 2 April 1990) is a model and beauty pageant titleholder who was crowned Miss Universe Netherlands 2009 and represented her country in the 2009 Miss Universe and Miss World pageants.

Early life
Born in Zwolle to parents of Indonesian descent, Weyzig has an older brother and one little sister.  In 2008, she lived for a year in Barcelona, where she learned Spanish. She also speaks fluent English, likes dancing, singing, shopping; and is currently studying international media and entertainment in Haarlem.

Miss Universe Nederland 2009

Miss Universe 2009
As the official representative of her country to the 2009 Miss Universe pageant, broadcast live from Nassau, Bahamas on 23 August 2009, Weyzig competed as one of 84 contestants, wearing an evening gown designed by Addy van den Krommenacker and was considered one of the favorites for the title.

Miss World 2009
Four months later, she was asked to represent the Netherlands in the 2009 Miss World pageant, held in Johannesburg on 12 December 2009, where she was going to participate in the 2010 FIFA World Cup final draw, but was told she wouldn't at the last second and some of her wardrobe was subsequently stolen.

Miss World Cup 2010
In June 2010 Weyzig represented the Netherlands in Miss World Cup 2010, a contest held in Germany to celebrate the 2010 FIFA World Cup, with a representative from each of the 32 participating nations. Weyzig placed third overall.

References

External links
 Official Miss Nederland website

   

1990 births
Dutch beauty pageant winners
Living people
Miss Universe 2009 contestants
Miss World 2009 delegates
People from Zwolle
Dutch people of Indonesian descent
Dutch female models